Papyrus 44 (in Gregory-Aland numbering), signed by 𝔓44, is an early copy of the New Testament in Greek. It is a papyrus manuscript of the Gospel of Matthew and Gospel of John. It contains Matt. 17:1-3.6-7; 18:15-17.19; 25:8-10 and John 10:8-14. Fragments of the Gospel of John formerly known as Papyrus 44b (containing verses 9:3-4; 12:16-18) have been reclassified as Papyrus 128. The manuscript paleographically has been assigned to the 6th or 7th century. 

The Greek text of this codex is a representative of the Alexandrian text-type. Aland placed it in Category II. 

It is currently housed at the Metropolitan Museum of Art (Inv. 14. 1. 527) in New York.

See also 

 List of New Testament papyri

References

Further reading 
 W. E. Crum, H. G. Evelyn-White, The Monastery of Epiphanius at Thebes, Metropolitan Museum of Art, Egyptian Expedition Publications IV, (New York, 1926), pp. 120–121. (transcription and collation).
 Ellwood M. Schofield, The Papyrus Fragments of the Greek New Testament, Southern Baptist Theological Seminary, Louisville, 1936, pp. 296–301.

External links 
 Papyrus 44 at the Metropolitan Museum of Art, accession number 14.1.527
 

New Testament papyri
6th-century biblical manuscripts
Gospel of Matthew papyri
Gospel of John papyri
7th-century biblical manuscripts